Robert Crothers Kirk (February 26, 1821 – 1898) was an American politician who served as the fifth lieutenant governor of Ohio from 1860 to 1862 under Governor William Dennison.

Biography
Robert Crothers Kirk was born February 26, 1821, in Mount Pleasant, Jefferson County, Ohio. He attended the schools in Mount Pleasant and entered Franklin College in New Athens, Ohio, but did not graduate. Other sources say he entered Ohio University in Athens, Ohio. He returned to his native town and studied medicine, and then took a course at University of Pennsylvania medical school in Philadelphia.

Kirk moved to Fulton County, Illinois, and began a medical practice. Some years later, he returned to Ohio and was in the mercantile business in Mount Vernon. He moved to Winona, Minnesota, for a year and then returned to Mount Vernon.

Career
In 1855, he was elected to the Ohio State Senate, and in 1859 he was elected Lieutenant Governor on the Republican ticket, serving a two-year term. Three years later, President Lincoln appointed him Minister to the Argentine Republic. He resigned in 1866 and returned to Ohio.

In 1869, President Grant appointed Kirk to be the Minister to Argentina and Uruguay. He resigned in 1871. In 1873, Governor Noyes appointed him Commissioner to represent Ohio at the Vienna Exposition. In 1875, he was appointed Collector of Internal Revenue for the Thirteenth Ohio District. He later returned to private life in Mount Vernon.

Family life
On December 11, 1843, Kirk married Eleanor Hogg, of Mt. Pleasant. They had four children. Kirk married a second time to Alice V. Hutchison on August 31, 1893. He was a Freemason and member of I.O.O.F. and the Methodist Episcopal Church.

Death
Kirk died in 1898 at age 77.

See also
 United States Ambassador to Argentina
 United States Ambassador to Uruguay

References

External links

1821 births
1898 deaths
Lieutenant Governors of Ohio
Ambassadors of the United States to Argentina
Ambassadors of the United States to Uruguay
People from Mount Pleasant, Ohio
People from Mount Vernon, Ohio
Republican Party Ohio state senators
Franklin College (New Athens, Ohio)
Physicians from Illinois
Perelman School of Medicine at the University of Pennsylvania alumni
Ohio University alumni
19th-century American diplomats
19th-century American politicians
People from Fulton County, Illinois